Mame Seck Mbacké (October 1947 – December 24, 2018) was a Senegalese writer. She wrote in French and in Wolof.

Biography
She was born in Gossas. Mbacké studied Social and Economic Development at the Institute of Higher International Studies in Paris. She worked as a diplomat in France and Morocco, then as a social worker at the Senegalese consulate in Paris. In Paris, she completed an International Relations degree at the Sorbonne and post-graduate studies in public health and nutrition at the Pantheon-Sorbonne University. She later worked for the Ministry for Foreign Affairs in Dakar.

Her short story "Mame Touba" was included in the anthology Anthologie de la Nouvelle Sénégalaise (1970–1977).

Mbacké established the publishing house Éditions Sembene in 2006.

Awards
In 1999, she received the Premier Prix de Poésie from the Ministry of Culture of the Republic of Senegal.

Selected works 
 Le chant des Séanes, poetry (1987)
 Poèmes en Etincelles, poetry (1999)
 Pluie – Poésie Les Pieds Sur La Mer, poetry (2000)
 Le Froid et le Piment, novel (2000)
 Qui est ma Femme?, play (2000)
 Les Alizés de la Souffrance: Poèmes, poetry (2001)
 Lions de la Teranga: L’Envol Sacré, poetry (2006)

References 

1947 births
2018 deaths
Senegalese women novelists
Senegalese novelists
Senegalese poets
Senegalese women poets
Senegalese dramatists and playwrights
University of Paris alumni
Pantheon-Sorbonne University alumni